was a Japanese actor and singer who appeared in many films and television series.

Life

Because of his parents' divorce, he left his home and went to Tokyo. In the same year, he debuted as a film actor at the Nikkatsu studio. In 1969, he received the Elan d'or Award for Newcomer of the Year. Oki was playing lead role in Toshiya Fujita's film " Wet Sand in August" but was forced to drop off in a motorcycle accident while shooting.

He gradually won popularity through his roles in television dramas such as Hissatsu series and Taiyo ni Hoero!. In 1979, Oki played lead role in Oretachi wa Tenshi da! on NTV and won new popularity.

In 1975, he became an adopted child of his talent agency president, Tadao Hikage.

Oki was one of the most influential candidates for the role of D Capt. Yonoi in Nagisa Oshima’s film in Merry Christmas, Mr. Lawrence but he had to step down because of his illness.

He ended his life by leaping from the top of a 47-story building, the Keio Plaza Hotel. He suffered from bipolar disorder. His suicide note for Hikage was

Films
 Arushojonokukuhaku Junketsu  (1968)
  (1969)
  (1969)
 Hanahiraku Musumetachi (1969)
   (1970)
  (1970)
  (1970) 
 Shinjuku outlaw: Step On the Gas (1970) as Rikiya
 Kantō Exile (1971)
 A Man′s World   (1971) as Osamu Ogata
  Za Gokiburi  (1973)
 The War in Space (1977) as Reisuke Muroi
 Rhyme of Vengeance (1978) as  Rentarō Tamon
 Kitamura Toya Wagafuyunouta (1978) as Ishizaka Kozen
 Hi no Tori (The Phoenix)) (1978) as Uraji
 Blue Christmas  (1978) as Harada
 Toward the Terra  (1980)
 Koto (also known as  Koto, the Ancient City) (1980) as Ryusuke Mizuki

Television
 Key Hunter (From episode210)
Hissatsu series
 Hissatsu Shiokinin (1973) as Kanoke no Joe
 Hissatsu Shiokiya Kagyō (1975) as Ichimatsu
 Hissatsu Karakurinin Fugakuhiyakkei Koroshitabi (1978) as Tōjūrō
Taiyō ni Hoero! ("Scotch") (1976–77) (1980-1982) as Taki Ryūichi
Daitsuiseki (1978) as Yabuki Shirō
Sanshiro Sugata as Higaki Gennosuke/ Higaki Tesshin
Oretachi wa Tenshi da! (1979) as Asō Masato
Shin Edo no Kaze (1980-1981) as Tachibana Seiichirō
Edo no Asayake (1981)
 Ōoku (1983) as Tokugawa Iemitsu

References

External links

Actors from Ōita Prefecture
People with bipolar disorder
Suicides by jumping in Japan
1952 births
1983 deaths
20th-century Japanese male actors
Musicians from Ōita Prefecture
1983 suicides